(R)-69 (3IQ) is a tetrahydropyridine derivative which acts as a 5-HT2A receptor agonist, with 4.6x selectivity over 5-HT2B and 49x selectivity over 5-HT2C. It has a 5-HT2A Ki of 680nM and an EC50 of 41nM. (R)-69 is a biased agonist selective for activation of the Gq coupled signalling pathway, with much weaker activation of the β-arrestin 2 coupled pathway. In animal studies it produces antidepressant-like activity but without producing the head-twitch response associated with psychedelic effects.

See also
 AAZ-A-154
 RU-24969
 SN-22

References 

Designer drugs
Pyrrolopyridines
Tetrahydropyridines